Benoît Paire is the defending champion, but chose to participate in the 2016 ABN AMRO World Tennis Tournament instead.

Pierre-Hugues Herbert won the title, defeating Egor Gerasimov in the final 6–3, 7–6(7–5).

Seeds

Draw

Finals

Top half

Bottom half

References
 Main Draw
 Qualifying Draw

Trofeo Faip-Perrel - Singles